Eureka, Texas is a ghost town in Crockett County, Texas. It was originally established as Couch Well, and in 1891 was one of the towns vying to become the county seat in the county's first election. Two cowboys who rode into San Angelo, Texas reported to the San Angelo Standard that Ozona had defeated Eureka in this election.

References

Crockett County, Texas
Ghost towns in Texas

History of Texas